The Otto Suhr Institut for Political Science (Otto-Suhr-Institut für Politikwissenschaft, short OSI) is a prestigious research institute of the Free University of Berlin. It is the leading institution for political science in Germany, and one of the most highly rated in the world. It is named after Otto Suhr, a former mayor of Berlin and is the successor of the German Academy for Poltics. 

The OSI's undergraduate and graduate programs in political science are consistently ranked the best in Germany and among the best in Europe. It is part of the Free University of Berlin’s Department of Political and Social Science, and offers dual degree programs with Sciences Po and HEC Paris. It is the most selective department for political science degrees in Germany.

History 
The OSI arose in 1959 from the Deutsche Hochschule für Politik (German Academy for Politics) founded in 1920, which was the leading educational institution for the Weimar Republic’s political elites. Otto Suhr (1894–1957; SPD) a professor at the institute who would later become mayor of Berlin, envisioned an institute for the teaching of democracy. The opening ceremony was hosted by Theodor Heuss, then President of Germany, who proclaimed "the breath of the world will blow through the doors of this institution".

The Otto-Suhr-Institut played a significant role in the German student movement in the late 1960s, as it became a place of political confrontation between traditional and socialist forces regarding the restructuring of the German university system. While the institute at one point employed some of the most prominent leftist thinkers, such as Johannes Agnoli, it has distanced itself from any political leanings in the late 20th and early 21st century.

Current activity 
The OSI is part of the Free University of Berlin’s Department of Political and Social Sciences. It continues to be the leading institution in the field of political science in Germany, focusing on the study of international relations. Since 2001, Thomas Risse has headed the institute's Centre for Transnational Relations, Foreign and Security Policy which was founded in 1986 as the Centre for Transatlantic Foreign and Security Policy by Helga Haftendorn.

Study Programmes 
The Otto-Suhr-Institut offer the following undergraduate and graduate study programmes: 
 BA Political Science
 BA Political Science for Education
 BA in political science, in partnership with Sciences Po
 MA Political Science
 MA International Relations
 MA Political Science - European Affairs, in partnership with Sciences Po
 MA Political Science - International Affairs, in partnership with Sciences Po Paris
 MA Public Policy and Management, in partnership with HEC Paris
 MA International Relations, in partnership with the Humboldt University of Berlin and the University of Potsdam
 MA International Relations, in partnership with the Humboldt University, the University of Potsdam and the Moscow State Institute of International Relations.

International programmes 
The institute offers an integrated German-French dual bachelor’s degree as well as a dual master’s degree programme with the Institut d’Études Politiques de Paris (the French grande école also known as Sciences Po), as well as a joint German-Russian master's degree programme in co-operation with the Moscow State Institute of International Relations. It also offers a dual degree in Public Policy and Management with HEC Paris (a famed French grande école and business school). The German-French dual degree programmes are recognised and coordinated by the Franco-German University.

The OSI also maintains several academic exchange agreements with top-ranking universities around the globe.

Notable faculty 
Johannes Agnoli, political scientist
Elmar Altvater, political scientist
Arnulf Baring, historian and political scientist
Tanja Börzel, European integration and governance scholar
Herta Däubler-Gmelin, former German Minister of Justice
Nils Diederich, political scientist and member of the Social Democratic Party of Germany
Jürgen W. Falter, political scientist
Ernst Fraenkel, political scientist
Ossip K. Flechtheim, political scientist and futurist scholar
Roman Herzog, former president of Germany
Axel Honneth, philosopher
Eva Kreisky, political scientist and jurist
Alexandre Kum’a Ndumbe, historian and scholar
Bernd Ladwig, political philosopher
Richard Löwenthal, journalist and political scientist
Elisabeth Noelle-Neumann, political scientist
Bohdan Osadchuk, historian and journalist
Ulrich K. Preuss, political scientist and jurist
Thomas Risse, international relations scholar
Gerhard A. Ritter, historian
Michaele Schreyer, former European Commissioner and member of the German Green Party
Klaus Schroeder, political scientist and historian
Gesine Schwan, political scientist and member of the Social Democratic Party of Germany
Klaus Segbers, political scientist and scholar
Richard Stöss, political scientist
Heinrich August Winkler, historian
Brigitte Young, political economist
Christoph Zürcher, political scientist

Notable alumni 
Reem Alabali-Radovan, politician
Béla Anda, journalist
Jakob Augstein, journalist and publishing heir
Dorothee Bär, politician
Arnulf Baring, historian and political scientist
Klaus Böger, former Berlin senator
Björn Böhning, former state secretary
Frank Bsirske, politician and trade unionist
Sawsan Chebli, politician
Annette Dittert, journalist and filmmaker
Jürgen W. Falter, political scientist
Ullrich Fichtner, journalist
Hermann L. Gremniza, journalist
Konstantin von Hammerstein, journalist
Bettina Jarasch, politician and Berlin senator
Christiane Lemke, politician and political scientist
Heinrich Lummer, former senator and mayor of Berlin
Lorenz Maroldt, editor-in-chief of Der Tagesspiegel
Alfred Mechtersheimer, former member of the Bundestag 
Walter Momper, former mayor of Berlin and president of the Bundesrat
Arend Oetker, businessman, politician and former president of the German Council of Foreign Relations
Peter Radunski, former senator and politician
Gerhard A. Ritter, historian
Hermann Scheer, politician and environmentalist
Otto Schily, former German Minister of the Interior
Sabine von Schorlemer, politician and jurist
Swen Schulz, former member of the Bundestag
Gesine Schwan, professor of political science
Michael Sommer, trade unionist
Gabor Steingart, journalist and former editor-in-chief of Handelsblatt
Günther Wehrmann, diplomat
Anne Will, TV journalist
Brigitte Young, political economist
Helga Zepp-LaRouche, political activist of the LaRouche movement and founder of the Schiller Institute

References

External links 
 Website of the Otto-Suhr-Institut (English)

 

Free University of Berlin
Political research institutes
Educational institutions established in 1959
Political science in Germany
1959 establishments in Germany